Stefanie Draws (born 16 October 1989 in Rostock) is a German former football defender.

Career
She began her football career at the age of five at Rostocker FC. Then, she went to FSV Dummerstorf 47 and joined the FFV Neubrandenburg in 2003. She became a permanent member of the first team which plays in the second division. Draws was offered to 1. FFC Turbine Potsdam and joined the Turbine in 2006. She made her first game for the Turbine in a UEFA Women's Cup match against the Belgian side KFC Rapide Wezemaal.

Draws won the Fritz Walter medal in bronze in 2006. She won the European Under-19 Championship with Germany in 2007.

In May 2017, at the age of 27, Draws announced her retirement from professional football.

External links
 Official homepage of 1. FFC Turbine Potsdam

1989 births
Living people
German women's footballers
1. FFC Turbine Potsdam players
Sportspeople from Rostock
Women's association football defenders
Footballers from Mecklenburg-Western Pomerania
20th-century German women
21st-century German women